John Alfred McAndrew (December 27, 1859 – July 1, 1923) was an Ontario lawyer and political figure. He represented Renfrew South in the Legislative Assembly of Ontario from 1886 to 1890 as a Liberal member.

He was born in Renfrew, Canada West in 1859, the son of John McAndrew, a Scottish immigrant. He studied at Renfrew, at Upper Canada College, the University of Toronto and the University of Edinburgh. McAndrew was called to the bar in 1885. After his term in office, he served as Chancery taxing officer and then registrar for the Court of Appeal for Ontario.

External links 
The Canadian parliamentary companion, 1889 JA Gemmill

Osgoode Hall : reminiscences of the bench and bar, JC Hamilton (1904)

1859 births
1923 deaths
Alumni of the University of Edinburgh
Ontario Liberal Party MPPs
People from Renfrew County